Corradini is an Italian surname that may refer to:

Francesco Berardino Corradini (1635–1718), Italian Roman Catholic Bishop of Marsi (1680–1718)
Pietro Marcellino Corradini (1658–1743), Italian Roman Catholic cardinal
Antonio Corradini (1688–1752), Venetian Rococo sculptor
Bartolommeo Corradini (15th century), Italian painter of the Quattrocento, active mainly in Urbino, also known as Fra Carnevale
Agustín Esteban Corradini (born 1984), Argentine retired field hockey player
Deedee Corradini (1944–2015), American businesswoman and politician
Enrico Corradini (1865–1931), Italian novelist, essayist, journalist and politician
Giancarlo Corradini (born 1961), Italian football manager and former player
Gino Corradini (born 1941), Italian weightlifter
Matteo Corradini (born 1975), Italian writer 
Melania Corradini (born 1987), Italian paralympic alpine skier
Nicolò Corradini (composer) (–1646), Italian composer and organist
Nicolò Corradini (skier) (born 1964), Italian ski-orienteering competitor